Maung Minbyu is one of 37 nats (spirits) in the official Burmese pantheon of nats. He is the nat representation of Crown Prince Minye Kyawswa, and son of Minkhaung I of Ava Kingdom. The fiery prince, whose birth name was Min Phyu (or Minbyu), died of wounds in the Forty Years' War in March 1415.

References

23